The 2014 Stevenage Borough Council election took place on 22 May 2014 to elect members of Stevenage Borough Council in England. This was on the same day as other local elections; the seats which were last contested in 2010. The Labour Party retained control of the council, which it had held continuously since 1973.

Ward results

Bandley Hill

Bedwell

Chells

Longmeadow

Manor

Martins Wood

Old Town

Pin Green

Roebuck

St Nicholas

Shephall (2 seats)

Symonds Green

Woodfield

References

2014 English local elections
2014
2010s in Hertfordshire